Hemiliostraca peasei is a species of small sea snail, a marine gastropod mollusk in the family Eulimidae.

Description

The shell measures approximately 8 mm in length.

References

External links
 To World Register of Marine Species

Eulimidae
Gastropods described in 1886